Yonge Eglinton Centre is a complex of two office buildings located on the northwest corner of Yonge and Eglinton in Toronto, Ontario, Canada, including a small shopping concourse. It is located across the street from Canada Square and, at time of construction, two of only a few large office towers found north of Bloor Street. It is connected via tunnel to Eglinton subway station.

The complex is undergoing a refit that will see 7 floors added to the 2300 Yonge Street and 5 floors added to 20 Eglinton Avenue West, as well as re-cladding the towers with curtain wall glass.

History
Construction started in the early 1970s by partnership of Greenwin and Horizon developers, and required the demolition of an existing Dominion supermarket, as well as F.W. Woolworth store and some residential homes to the west.

The project was completed in several phases. The first phase consisted of large 23 storey rental apartment building at 411 Duplex Avenue, followed by 20 Eglinton West and half the base retail concourse.

Phase Two was construction of the remainder of the retail over the entire block and construction of the other office tower at 2300 Yonge Street.

Final Phase was construction of a large rental apartment building at 33 Orchardview.

Buildings

2300 Yonge Street

The tower is anchored by the complex owners, RioCan, who relocated their head office to Tower I in 2007.  The building houses many offices and retail shops in the lobby as well as TTC (Toronto Transit Commission or simply the Subway) access.

20 Eglinton Avenue West

Retail Complex

There are three levels for retail space below the towers. The Yonge Eglinton Centre houses over 65 stores and services:

 The Fresh Tea Shop
 Winners
 Toys "R" Us
 GoodLife Fitness
 Cineplex VIP
 Pickle Barrel
 Indigo Books
 Urban Outfitters
 Metro - originally as Dominion which occupied the site before the complex was built
 HSBC
 Rexall
 Sephora
 Tim Hortons

In 1973, T. Eaton Company opened one of its Horizon discount department stores at the property.  The space was converted to a regular Eaton's store upon the closure of the Horizon chain in January 1978; the Eaton's store closed in the 1990s.

References

Buildings and structures in Toronto
Modernist architecture in Canada